Pitcairnia elvirae, synonym Pepinia verrucosa,  is a species of flowering plant in the family Bromeliaceae, endemic to Ecuador. It was first described in 1999. Its natural habitats are subtropical or tropical moist lowland forests and subtropical or tropical moist montane forests. It is threatened by habitat loss.

References

Endemic flora of Ecuador
elvirae
Vulnerable plants
Plants described in 1999
Taxonomy articles created by Polbot